This list is of the Cultural Properties of Japan designated in the category of  for the Prefecture of Yamaguchi.

National Cultural Properties
As of 1 July 2019, thirteen Important Cultural Properties (including one *National Treasure) have been designated, being of national significance.

Prefectural Cultural Properties
As of 1 May 2019, twenty-nine properties have been designated at a prefectural level.

See also
 Cultural Properties of Japan
 List of National Treasures of Japan (paintings)
 Japanese painting
 List of Historic Sites of Japan (Yamaguchi)

References

External links
  Cultural Properties in Yamaguchi Prefecture

Cultural Properties,Yamaguchi
Cultural Properties,Paintings
Paintings,Yamaguchi
Lists of paintings